Coleophora aquaecadentis is a moth of the family Coleophoridae first described by Giorgio Baldizzone and Hugo van der Wolf in 2004. It is endemic to Namibia.

References

External links

aquaecadentis
Moths described in 2004
Endemic fauna of Namibia
Moths of Africa